Manuleleua Paletasala Tovale  is a Samoan politician and member of the Legislative Assembly of Samoa. He is a member of the FAST Party.

He was first elected to the Legislative Assembly of Samoa in the 2021 Samoan general election. An election petition against him was struck out in June 2021. On 28 July 2021 he was appointed Associate Minister for the Prime Minister and Cabinet.

References

Living people
Members of the Legislative Assembly of Samoa
Faʻatuatua i le Atua Samoa ua Tasi politicians
Year of birth missing (living people)